Darren Poole (born 27 October 1962) is a Canadian former international soccer player who played as a midfielder.

He played at club level for Edmonton Drillers, Edmonton Eagles and Edmonton Brick Men.

References

1962 births
Living people
Association football forwards
Canadian soccer players
Canada men's international soccer players
Edmonton Drillers (1979–1982) players
Edmonton Brick Men players
North American Soccer League (1968–1984) players
Soccer players from Edmonton
Edmonton Eagles players
Canadian Professional Soccer League (original) players